α Mensae (Latinised as Alpha Mensae, abbreviated to α Men or Alpha Men) is the brightest star in the constellation Mensa. At a magnitude of 5.09, it is the dimmest lucida (a constellation's brightest star) in the sky. Due to its declination, on Earth it is best visible from higher latitudes of the southern hemisphere, yet can also be seen, though low in the sky, from just north of the Equator when near its daily arc's highest point, the culmination.

This star has a stellar classification of G7 V, indicating that it is a G-type main sequence star that is generating energy by fusing hydrogen into helium at its core. It is of similar size but slightly cooler than the Sun, with 96.4% of the mass, 96% of the radius, and 81% of the Sun's luminosity. The effective temperature of the stellar atmosphere is 5,569 K, and it has a slightly higher (129%) proportion of elements other than hydrogen and helium—what astronomers call the star's metallicity—compared to the Sun. The estimated age of this star is 6.2 billion years, and is rotating at a relatively leisurely projected rotational velocity of 0.6 km/s.

Located about 33 light years distant from the Sun, Alpha Mensae has a relatively high proper motion across the sky. It has already made its closest approach to the Sun, coming within about  around 250,000 years ago. A candidate infrared excess has been detected around this star, most which would indicate the presence of a circumstellar disk at a radius of over 147 AU. The derived temperature of this dust is below 22 K. However, data from Herschel Space Observatory failed to confirm this excess, leaving the finding in doubt. No planetary companions have yet been discovered around it. It has a red dwarf companion star at an angular separation of 3.05 arcseconds; equivalent to a projected separation of roughly 30 AU. With a mass just 16.9% that of the Sun, the companion is fully convective.

References

External links
 
 
 
 

Mensae, Alpha
043834
029271
2261
0231
CD-74 00294
Mensa (constellation)
G-type main-sequence stars
Mensae, Alpha